The 1958 Nebraska gubernatorial election was held on November 4, 1958, and featured school superintendent Ralph G. Brooks, a Democrat, narrowly defeating incumbent Republican Governor Victor E. Anderson, becoming the first Democrat to win the governorship since 1938.

Democratic primary

Candidates
Ralph G. Brooks, school superintendent
Edward A. Dosek

Results

Republican primary

Candidates
Victor E. Anderson, incumbent Governor
Louis H. Hector

Results

General election

Results

References

Gubernatorial
1958
Nebraska
November 1958 events in the United States